In mathematics, infinite compositions of analytic functions (ICAF) offer alternative formulations of analytic continued fractions, series, products and other infinite expansions, and the theory evolving from such compositions may shed light on the convergence/divergence of these expansions. Some functions can actually be expanded directly as infinite compositions. In addition, it is possible to use ICAF to evaluate solutions of fixed point equations involving infinite expansions. Complex dynamics offers another venue for iteration of systems of functions rather than a single function. For infinite compositions of a single function see Iterated function. For compositions of a finite number of functions, useful in fractal theory, see Iterated function system.

Although the title of this article specifies analytic functions, there are results for more general functions of a complex variable as well.

Notation
There are several notations describing infinite compositions, including the following:

Forward compositions: 

Backward compositions: 

In each case convergence is interpreted as the existence of the following limits:

One may also write   and

Contraction theorem
Many results can be considered extensions of the following result:

Infinite compositions of contractive functions
Let {fn} be a sequence of functions analytic on a simply-connected domain S. Suppose there exists a compact set Ω ⊂ S such that for each n, fn(S) ⊂ Ω.

Additional theory resulting from investigations based on these two theorems, particularly Forward Compositions Theorem, include location analysis for the limits obtained in the following reference. For a different approach to Backward Compositions Theorem, see the following reference.

Regarding Backward Compositions Theorem, the example f2n(z) = 1/2 and f2n−1(z) = −1/2 for S = {z : |z| < 1} demonstrates the inadequacy of simply requiring contraction into a compact subset, like Forward Compositions Theorem.

For functions not necessarily analytic the Lipschitz condition suffices:

Infinite compositions of other functions

Non-contractive complex functions 
Results involving entire functions include the following, as examples. Set

Then the following results hold:

Additional elementary results include:

Example GF1: 

Example GF2:

Linear fractional transformations 
Results for compositions of linear fractional (Möbius) transformations include the following, as examples:

Examples and applications

Continued fractions 
The value of the infinite continued fraction

may be expressed as the limit of the sequence {Fn(0)} where

As a simple example, a well-known result (Worpitsky Circle*) follows from an application of Theorem (A):

Consider the continued fraction

with

Stipulate that |ζ| < 1 and |z| < R < 1.  Then for 0 < r < 1,

 , analytic for |z| < 1. Set R = 1/2.

Example.  
]

Example. A fixed-point continued fraction form (a single variable).

Direct functional expansion 
Examples illustrating the conversion of a function directly into a composition follow:

Example 1. Suppose  is an entire function satisfying the following conditions:

Then 
.

Example 2. 

Example 3. 

Example 4.

Calculation of fixed-points 
Theorem (B) can be applied to determine the fixed-points of functions defined by infinite expansions or certain integrals. The following examples illustrate the process:

Example FP1. For |ζ| ≤ 1 let

To find α = G(α), first we define:

Then calculate  with ζ = 1, which gives: α = 0.087118118... to ten decimal places after ten iterations.

Evolution functions 
Consider a time interval, normalized to I = [0, 1]. ICAFs can be constructed to describe continuous motion of a point, z, over the interval, but in such a way that at each "instant" the motion is virtually zero (see Zeno's Arrow): For the interval divided into n equal subintervals, 1 ≤ k ≤ n set  analytic or simply continuous – in a domain S, such that

 for all k and all z in S, 

Principal example 

implies

where the integral is well-defined if  has a closed-form solution z(t).  Then

Otherwise, the integrand is poorly defined although the value of the integral is easily computed. In this case one might call the integral a "virtual" integral.

Example. 
]

Example. Let:

Next, set  and Tn(z) = Tn,n(z). Let

when that limit exists. The sequence {Tn(z)} defines contours γ = γ(cn, z) that follow the flow of the vector field f(z). If there exists an attractive fixed point α, meaning |f(z) − α| ≤ ρ|z − α| for 0 ≤ ρ < 1, then Tn(z) → T(z) ≡ α along γ = γ(cn, z), provided (for example) . If cn ≡ c > 0, then Tn(z) → T(z), a point on the contour γ = γ(c, z). It is easily seen that

and

when these limits exist.

These concepts are marginally related to active contour theory in image processing, and are simple generalizations of the Euler method

Self-replicating expansions

Series
The series defined recursively by fn(z) = z + gn(z) have the property that the nth term is predicated on the sum of the first n − 1 terms. In order to employ theorem (GF3) it is necessary to show boundedness in the following sense: If each fn is defined for |z| < M then |Gn(z)| < M must follow before |fn(z) − z| = |gn(z)| ≤ Cβn is defined for iterative purposes. This is because  occurs throughout the expansion. The restriction

serves this purpose. Then Gn(z) → G(z) uniformly on the restricted domain.

Example (S1).   Set 
 
and M = ρ2. Then R = ρ2 − (π/6) > 0. Then, if , z in S implies |Gn(z)| < M and theorem (GF3) applies, so that

converges absolutely, hence is convergent.

Example (S2):

Products
The product defined recursively by

has the appearance

In order to apply Theorem GF3 it is required that:

Once again, a boundedness condition must support

If one knows Cβn in advance, the following will suffice:

Then Gn(z) → G(z) uniformly on the restricted domain.

Example (P1).  Suppose  with  observing after a few preliminary computations, that |z| ≤ 1/4 implies |Gn(z)| < 0.27. Then

and

converges uniformly.

Example (P2).

Continued fractions
Example (CF1): A self-generating continued fraction.

 

Example (CF2): Best described as a self-generating reverse Euler continued fraction.

See also

Generalized continued fraction

References

Complex analysis
Analytic functions
Fixed-point theorems
Algorithmic art
Emergence